Patricia A. Rowbotham,  (born Dec.8, 1953) is a Canadian judge who is currently a Justice at the Alberta Court of Appeal in Calgary, Alberta, Canada.

She earned an LL.B. in 1981 from the Faculty of Law at the University of Calgary and an LL.M. from Cambridge University in 1984. Rowbotham clerked at the Supreme Court of Canada after law school and was a bencher of the Law Society of Alberta. She was first appointed to the judiciary as a judge at the Alberta Court of Queen's Bench by Anne McLellan on June 9, 1999.

On June 1, 2007, Prime Minister Stephen Harper appointed Madame Justice Patricia Rowbotham to the Alberta Court of Appeal. In addition to being a Justice of the Alberta Court of Appeal, Patricia Rowbowtham was, on the recommendation of the Minister of Justice, also appointed Judge of the Court of Appeal of the Northwest Territories, of the Court of Appeal of Nunavut, and member ex-officio of the Alberta Court of Queen's Bench.

Patricia Rowbotham is also a recipient of the Golden Jubilee Medal from the Governor General of Canada.

References

Judges in Alberta
Living people
University of Calgary Faculty of Law alumni
University of Calgary alumni
Alumni of the University of Cambridge
Canadian King's Counsel
Judges in the Northwest Territories
Judges in Nunavut
Year of birth missing (living people)